Jarod is an alternative form of Jared and other variants like Jarred, Jarrad, Jarad, Jarid, Jarrid, Jareth, Jay, Jered, Jerad, Jerrad, Jarrod, Jerid, Jerrid, Jerrod, Jerred, and Jerod.

Jarod may refer to:

Places
Jarod, Gujarat, a village in Vaghodia Taluka of Vadodara district in Gujarat state of India

Persons
Jarod Green (born 1981), Australian film director, screenwriter
Jarod Miller, host for television series Animal Exploration with Jarod Miller
Jarod Palmer (born 1986), American ice hockey player

Fictional characters
Jarod The Pretender or just Jarod on TV series The Pretender

See also
Jared
Jarrod